The Isdera Imperator 108i was a low-volume German sports car produced from 1984 to 1993. The Imperator 108i was born out of the Mercedes-Benz CW311 concept car from 1978, which Eberhard Schulz, who at the time worked as a design engineer for Porsche, designed in his free time. Mercedes-Benz had no interest in putting the CW311 into production, so Schulz established his own engineering company, Isdera, to produce the car under his own brand.

Specifications and performance 
Implementing a fiberglass body upon a tubular steel spaceframe, the Isdera Imperator 108i was comparable to the exotic sports cars of its day. Little was changed from the original Mercedes-Benz show car with the most noticeable changes being the replacement of the pop-up headlights with two fixed units and more conventional tail lights sourced from Mercedes-Benz. As Mercedes-Benz developed more powerful V8 engines, they were used in the Imperator 108i.

Unusually, the Imperator 108i featured a rear-view periscope in place of conventional rear view mirrors which gave the driver the rear view, creating a bulge on the roof. It also featured gullwing doors.

Inside, the car featured a luxurious interior and sourced many interior components from the Porsche 928.

Model year changes 
In 1991, the car received a face-lift which saw the return of the pop-up headlamps from the 1978 show car and a more curvaceous body shape, additional vents at the front near the doors, NACA duct on the front in place of three vents, redesigned front grille and repositioning of turning indicators from the front grille to the bottom of the headlamps along with optional wing mirrors. Around 17 cars were produced with the face lift design.

Production 
Production ended in 1993 with a total of thirty examples produced, two of which were exported to Japan.

Gallery

References

External links

Imperator 108i
1990s cars
Cars introduced in 1984
Rear mid-engine, rear-wheel-drive vehicles
Cars discontinued in 1993